The 2012–13 Welsh Football League Division One began on 10 August 2012 and ended on 18 May 2013.

Team changes from 2011–12
Aberaman Athletic changed name to Aberdare Town.

Monmouth Town, Tata Steel and Caerleon were promoted from the Welsh Football League Division Two.

Caerau (Ely), Cardiff Corinthians, Cwmaman Institute were relegated to the Welsh Football League Division Two.

Barry Town withdrew from the division and were adopted to the Welsh Football League Division Three under name Barry Town United.

League table

External links
 Welsh Football League

2011-12
2012–13 in Welsh football leagues